Vitriola is the eighth studio album by the post-hardcore band Cursive, released on October 5, 2018 on the band's own label 15 Passenger Records. The album is the first release from Cursive in six years, the first with original drummer Clint Schnase since 2006's Happy Hollow, and the first Cursive release to feature a cellist – Megan Seibe – since 2003's The Ugly Organ.

Critical reception 

Vitriola received a weighted average score of 69 out of 100, indicating "generally favorable reviews," from the music review aggregator Metacritic. Fred Thomas of AllMusic compares the album to previous Cursive releases, saying, "While it can feel relentless at times, these songs find Kasher and his bandmates swinging at anything that moves with all the passion and power of their best albums." Sputnikmusic's Channing Freemen makes a similar assertion, specifically comparing the album to The Ugly Organ in its vibe and tone.

Track listing

Personnel 
 Tim Kasher – vocals and guitar
 Ted Stevens – guitar and vocals
 Matt Maginn – bass
 Patrick Newberry – keyboards, piano, and horns
 Clint Schnase – drums
 Megan Siebe – cello
 Mike Mogis – additional instrumentation

Charts

References

External links 
 Cursive at 15 Passenger Records
 Vitriola on Bandcamp

2018 albums
Cursive (band) albums
Big Scary Monsters Recording Company albums
Albums produced by Mike Mogis